Cyndy Garvey (née Cynthia Truhan) (born July 16, 1949, Detroit, Michigan) is an American television personality and former wife of baseball player Steve Garvey.

Career
Cyndy Garvey replaced Sarah Purcell as Regis Philbin's co-host of the local news/talk show A.M. Los Angeles on KABC-TV from 1978 to 1981. She is perhaps best known as a co-host, with Bryant Gumbel, of the novelty sports series Games People Play (1980). From 1983 to 1984, she was Regis Philbin's co-host on The Morning Show, on WABC-TV in New York City, the show which later became the nationally syndicated Live with Kelly and Ryan. In 1986, she participated for two weeks as a celebrity guest on The $25,000 Pyramid.

Personal life
She married Steve Garvey on October 27, 1971; they divorced in 1983. The couple had two daughters.

Sources and notes
 "Suit accuses LAPD officer of selling celebrity data", USA Today, April 9, 2003
 

Living people
1949 births
American television personalities
American women television personalities